William Lockhart (3 October 1811 – 29 April 1896) was a Protestant Christian missionary who served with the London Missionary Society during the late Qing Dynasty in China. In 1844, he founded the first western hospital in Shanghai, which was known as the Chinese Hospital. The hospital is named Renji Hospital now, which is one of the most famous hospitals in China.

Biography

Lockhart was born in Liverpool and received medical training at Meath Hospital in Dublin and Guy's Hospital in London. In 1834, he became a member of the Royal College of Surgeons of England and later of the London Missionary Society (LMS). With the LMS, in 1838 he travelled to Canton, and then to Macau and Shanghai, where he stayed intermittently from 1842 to 1863; in Macau and Shanghai he opened hospitals. In 1857, he became fellow of the Royal College of Surgeons, in 1864 director of the LMS and in 1878 President of the Medical Missionary Association. In 1861, Lockhart published a book titled The medical missionary in China: a narrative of twenty years' experience, where among other things he insisted that one should not serve both as a preacher and a physician. The papers of William Lockhart are held by SOAS Archives.

References

Further reading
 
 

Protestant missionaries in China
Christian writers
1811 births
1896 deaths
English Protestant missionaries
Christian medical missionaries
British expatriates in China